Khemenu (Ḫmnw) may refer to:
the Ogdoad (Egyptian), the eight primordial deities worshipped in Hermopolis.
Hermopolis, a major city in the ancient Egypt (Roman province).